Acromantis oligoneura is a species of praying mantis the family Hymenopodidae described by Wilhelm de Haan in 1842. No subspecies are listed.

See also
List of mantis genera and species

References 

oligoneura
Mantodea of Asia
Insects described in 1942